Global Crossing Airlines, Inc., operating as GlobalX Airlines is an American Part 121, domestic, flag, and supplemental charter airline headquartered in Miami, Florida. The airline was founded in 2019 by Ed Wegel, who previously co-founded the reincarnated Eastern Air Lines. GlobalX provides ad-hoc passenger charter and cargo airlift to destinations throughout the United States, Caribbean and Latin America.

History
In 2019, GlobalX completed a merger with Canada Jetlines, an ultra low-cost airline headquartered in Mississauga, Ontario. In late 2020, GlobalX formed CubaX, a tour operator that will provide weekly non-stop flights from Miami to Havana, Cuba. Starting in 2021, CubaX will operate daily charter flights using GlobalX aircraft. As demand increases, the airline will add more routes in partnership with large tour operators in other key markets.

Fleet

Current fleet
As of January 2023, GlobalX operates the following aircraft:

Fleet development
On January 19, 2021, the airline took delivery of its first Airbus A320-200. In November 2021, GlobalX announced its first A321-200/P2F conversion entered the first phase of conversion at HAECO in Lake City, Florida. The aircraft, owned by Greenwich Highland Aviation (GHA), is a former AtlasGlobal aircraft. This is the first of four aircraft to be converted by GHA, and will be leased to GlobalX for use under their 'XCargo' division by September 2022. On June 14, 2022, GlobalX and GHA announced an agreement had been reached for the second Passenger-to-Freighter converted aircraft, which is due to enter service with XCargo by the end of Q4 2022. In September 2022, GlobalX struck a deal with Eviation to buy 50 all-electric Alice commuter aircraft; delivery is scheduled for 2027.

XCargo
On October 20, 2020, GlobalX launched XCargo with an intent to lease 10 converted Airbus A321 freighters from the asset management specialist Vallair, in cooperation with Elbe Flugzeugwerke. In May 2021, GlobalX announced it has signed a letter of intent (LOI) to lease five additional Airbus A321 Passenger-to-Freighter (P2F) aircraft from ST Engineering’s Aviation Asset Management unit. This brought the total number of potential A321-200P2F aircraft to 15. On March 11, 2022, GlobalX signed a long-term lease of two Airbus A321-200P2F aircraft from Petrus Aerovista A321 Holdings LLC, a joint venture between Aerovista and Petrus Aviation. On May 23, 2022, GlobalX announced they had entered an agreement with Colombian-based cargo airline Avianca Cargo to operate their A321-200P2F aircraft on a charter basis. CEO Ed Wegel later stated that the first A321-200P2F aircraft will be dedicated to Avianca's operation. On June 15, 2022, GlobalX signed a Memorandum of Understanding (MoU) with Chinese logistics firm FreightCloud and its financial partner Hudson Highland Partners to establish an Asia-U.S. cargo trade lane using GlobalX’s A321 freighters. Operations are expected to begin within the first Quarter of 2023. In the same announcement, GlobalX announced it anticipates the future use of Airbus A330-200 freighters, but arrival of these aircraft will not be until late-2023 at the earliest.

See also
List of airlines of the United States

References

Charter airlines of the United States
Airlines established in 2018
Airlines based in Florida